Gliophorus viridis is a species of agaric fungus in the family Hygrophoraceae found in New Zealand and Australia.

References

Hygrophoraceae
Fungi of New Zealand
Fungi of Australia
Taxa named by Egon Horak